Ryu Won (born Joo Won on November 8, 1997) is a South Korean actress. She is best known for her role in the MBC's series Missing 9.

Early life 
Ryu Won was born Joo Won in Haeundae, Busan. Ryu changed her name to Ryu Won, based on her mother's surname. She changed her name because there is another actor with the same name, Joo Won. Ryu lived in Busan till she was in third grade of elementary school, then immigrated with her family to the United States.

The actress stated that she was originally interested in fashion design or art instead of acting. After entering a beauty contest in Los Angeles when she was 17 years old, she got an offer from JYP Entertainment to be a trainee there. The actress then moved to South Korea and started studying acting after graduating from high school at the age of 18.

Career

2015–present: Debut
Ryu Won made her debut in the short film Alice: Crack of Season in 2015. In December 2015, Ryu was cast to play in the KBS2's drama Uncontrollably Fond as a wealthy daughter of Yoo Oh-Sung's character, and is a big fan of Kim Woo-Bin's character. She made her small screen debut in July 2016.

In January, 2017 Ryu played as a Hallyu actress in the MBC's disaster drama Missing 9. Ryu then starred as the female lead in EXO's Baekhyun music video of his single "Take You Home" which was released on April 14, 2017.

In November 2019 Ryu played the role of Mickey on the SBS’s drama Vagabond as Edward Park’s assistant.

Filmography

Films

Television series

Web series

Music videos

Endorsements

Awards and nominations

References

External links
 Ryu Won at JYP Entertainment
 
 
 Ryu Won on Daum 

Living people
South Korean emigrants to the United States
JYP Entertainment artists
South Korean film actresses
South Korean television actresses
1997 births